Compugoal Technical College is a private college located in Nairobi, Kenya. The college was founded in 1996. The Principal of the College is Dr. Patrick Mulwa, Phd. The College offers Courses and Distance Learning(Zoom Classes) in computer Science, Business Studies, Hospitality Management, Tourism Management and Languages (German, Spanish, Italian, Mandarin, French, English and Swahili).

Affiliation
Compugoal Technical College is located in Nairobi's Central Business District and is Fully registered and approved by TVETA under the Ministry of Education. Compugoal Technical College is affiliated to the following examination bodies: ICM-UK, City and Guilds, Kenya National Examination Council (KNEC), Association of Business Executives (ABE-UK), ABMA(Association of Business Managers and Administrators), NITA(National Industrial Training Authority), ICDL(International Computer Driving License), KASNEB(Kenya Accountants and Secretaries National Examinations Board) and IATA(International Air Transport Association).

Educational institutions established in 1996
Private universities and colleges in Kenya
Education in Nairobi
1996 establishments in Kenya